Quiznation may refer to:

 Quiznation (UK game show) (2003–2007), a British quiz channel owned and operated by Optimistic Entertainment
 quiznation (U.S. game show) (2007), a live interactive game show on GSN